Klamath Union High School is a public high school located in Klamath Falls, Oregon, United States.

History
Funding of the school began in 1901, with the first graduate in 1903.  The construction of the school began in 1927, with the first marching band the following year. KUHS opened with 520 students and had 77 graduates in its first year. Paul Jackson was the principal and, in 1958, Pelican Pete was chosen as the school's mascot.

The school colors are red and white, and a large "K" is marked in white stone on a nearby hill.

Academics
In 2008, 89% of the school's seniors received a high school diploma. Of 186 students, 166 graduated, 14 dropped out, three received a modified diploma, and three were still in high school in 2009.

Band

Every other year the Klamath Union Marching Band takes a trip to Victoria, British Columbia, to march in the Victoria Day parade. In past years the band has won several awards through the competition. For several years in a row, the Symphonic Band has been district champions and qualified for state, once winning first place in the state competition. In 2013 the band took fourth in state, and in 2014 they moved up to third. The band is currently under the direction of Allen Haugh.

Notable alumni

 Ian Dobson - track and field athlete, competed at the 2008 Olympics
 James Ivory - film director, Merchant Ivory Productions
 John Witte - football player
 Don Pedro Colley - actor
 Paul Minner - Major League Baseball pitcher 
 Bob Moore - NFL Tight End

References

Buildings and structures in Klamath Falls, Oregon
High schools in Klamath County, Oregon
Educational institutions established in 1901
Public high schools in Oregon
1901 establishments in Oregon